The Saturday Club, established in 1855, was an informal monthly gathering in Boston, Massachusetts, of writers, scientists, philosophers, historians, and other notable thinkers of the mid-19th century.

Overview
The club began meeting informally at the Albion House in Boston. Publishing agent and lawyer Horatio Woodman first suggested the gatherings among his friends for food and conversation. By 1856, the organization became more structured with a loose set of rules, with monthly meetings held over dinner at the Parker House. The Parker House served as their place of meeting for many years. It was a hotel built in 1854 by Harvey D. Parker.

The gatherings led to the creation of the Atlantic Monthly, to which many of the members contributed. The name was suggested by early member Oliver Wendell Holmes Sr.

The original members of the group included Woodman, Louis Agassiz, Richard Henry Dana Jr., Judge Ebenezer Rockwood Hoar, Senator George Frisbee Hoar, and James Russell Lowell. In the following years, membership was extended to Holmes, Cornelius Conway Felton, Henry Wadsworth Longfellow, and William Hickling Prescott. Other members included Ralph Waldo Emerson, Asa Gray, John Lothrop Motley, Benjamin Peirce, Charles Sumner, John Greenleaf Whittier, and others. Invitations to the group were considered a sort of affirmation of acceptance into Boston's high society. Ohio-native William Dean Howells was invited by James Russell Lowell in 1860 and recalled in a memoir that it seemed like a rite of passage. Holmes joked that Howells's presence served as "something like the apostolic succession... the laying on of hands". A few years later, Howells was named editor of the Atlantic Monthly, which published many of the works by members of the group.

In 1884, Oliver Wendell Holmes published a poem titled "At the Saturday Club" in which he reminisced about the gatherings. By then, many of its members were dead. Ralph Waldo Emerson's son, Edward Waldo Emerson, published two books about the Saturday Club and its members in the early 20th century. A version of the Saturday Club still exists in Boston.

Gallery

Further reading 
 Adams, Thomas Boylston. Saturday Club 1957–1986. Boston: Saturday Club, 1988.
 Emerson, Edward Waldo. Early years of the Saturday Club, 1855–1870. Boston: Houghton Mifflin, 1918. 
 Emerson, Edward Waldo. Later years of the Saturday Club, 1870–1920. Boston: Houghton Mifflin, 1927.
 Forbes, Edward Waldo. Saturday Club: A Century Completed, 1920–1956. Boston: Houghton Mifflin, 1958.
 Holmes, Oliver Wendell. "At the Saturday Club". 1884.

References

External links
Guide to the Saturday Club Records, Massachusetts Historical Society
Omni Parker House Boston at "Historic Hotels of America", National Trust for Historic Preservation
"At the Saturday Club" by Oliver Wendell Holmes

1855 establishments in Massachusetts
Cultural history of Boston
Clubs and societies in Boston
Philosophical societies in the United States
19th century in Boston